This is a list of episodes of the 2012–2013 Kamen Rider Series Kamen Rider Wizard.

Episodes


{| class="wikitable" width="98%"
|-style="border-bottom:8px solid #FF5F5F"
! width="4%" | # !! Title !! Writer !! Original airdate
|-|colspan="5" bgcolor="#e6e9ff"|

The Ringed Wizard

|-|colspan="5" bgcolor="#e6e9ff"|

I Want to Be a Wizard

|-|colspan="5" bgcolor="#e6e9ff"|

Transform! Live Broadcast

|-|colspan="5" bgcolor="#e6e9ff"|

The Doll and the Pianist

|-|colspan="5" bgcolor="#e6e9ff"|

The Deciding Match of the Contest

|-|colspan="5" bgcolor="#e6e9ff"|

To a Beautiful Flower

|-|colspan="5" bgcolor="#e6e9ff"|

Buying Memories

|-|colspan="5" bgcolor="#e6e9ff"|

A New Magic Stone

|-|colspan="5" bgcolor="#e6e9ff"|

The Dragon's Cry

|-|colspan="5" bgcolor="#e6e9ff"|

National Security Bureau Section 0

|-|colspan="5" bgcolor="#e6e9ff"|

The Promise to Defend

|-|colspan="5" bgcolor="#e6e9ff"|

The Wagashi of Hope

|-|colspan="5" bgcolor="#e6e9ff"|

The Heir to the Dream

|-|colspan="5" bgcolor="#e6e9ff"|

The Return of the Film Director

|-|colspan="5" bgcolor="#e6e9ff"|

After the Last Scene Is...

|-|colspan="5" bgcolor="#e6e9ff"|

The Christmas Miracle

|-|colspan="5" bgcolor="#e6e9ff"|

Another Wizard

|-|colspan="5" bgcolor="#e6e9ff"|

Magical Power Eating

|-|colspan="5" bgcolor="#e6e9ff"|

Today's Life, Tomorrow's Life

|-|colspan="5" bgcolor="#e6e9ff"|

Learning the Truth

|-|colspan="5" bgcolor="#e6e9ff"|

The Crazed Dance of the Dragons

|-|colspan="5" bgcolor="#e6e9ff"|

The Phoenix's Rampage

|-|colspan="5" bgcolor="#e6e9ff"|

Deathmatch

|-|colspan="5" bgcolor="#e6e9ff"|

The Wizard's Grandmother

|-|colspan="5" bgcolor="#e6e9ff"|

Life Choices

|-|colspan="5" bgcolor="#e6e9ff"|

Campus Infiltration

|-|colspan="5" bgcolor="#e6e9ff"|

Big and Little Sisters

|-|colspan="5" bgcolor="#e6e9ff"|

The Stolen Belt

|-|colspan="5" bgcolor="#e6e9ff"|

The Evolving Wild Beast

|-|colspan="5" bgcolor="#e6e9ff"|

The Day Magic Disappeared

|-|colspan="5" bgcolor="#e6e9ff"|

Tears

|-|colspan="5" bgcolor="#e6e9ff"|

Part-Time Danger

|-|colspan="5" bgcolor="#e6e9ff"|

What Money Can't Buy

|-|colspan="5" bgcolor="#e6e9ff"|

The Other Side of a Popular Model

|-|colspan="5" bgcolor="#e6e9ff"|

The Other Side of Sora

|-|colspan="5" bgcolor="#e6e9ff"|

The Myna Bird Speaks

|-|colspan="5" bgcolor="#e6e9ff"|

Wanted: Despair

|-|colspan="5" bgcolor="#e6e9ff"|

Stolen Hope

|-|colspan="5" bgcolor="#e6e9ff"|

What Was Forgotten On the Pitch

|-|colspan="5" bgcolor="#e6e9ff"|

I Want to Ride a Bike

|-|colspan="5" bgcolor="#e6e9ff"|

The Wizard Fate

|-|colspan="5" bgcolor="#e6e9ff"|

The Ringed Novelist

|-|colspan="5" bgcolor="#e6e9ff"|

The White Wizard's Secret

|-|colspan="5" bgcolor="#e6e9ff"|

The Son's Keepsake

|-|colspan="5" bgcolor="#e6e9ff"|

The Smile in My Heart

|-|colspan="5" bgcolor="#e6e9ff"|

The Cracked Feelings

|-|colspan="5" bgcolor="#e6e9ff"|

The Truth About Wiseman

|-|colspan="5" bgcolor="#e6e9ff"|

The Philosopher's Stone

|-|colspan="5" bgcolor="#e6e9ff"|

The Beginning of the Sabbath

|-|colspan="5" bgcolor="#e6e9ff"|

What Is Important?

|-|colspan="5" bgcolor="#e6e9ff"|

The Last Hope

|-|colspan="5" bgcolor="#e6e9ff"|

The Kamen Rider Rings

|-|colspan="5" bgcolor="#e6e9ff"|

The Endless Story

|}

References

See also

Wizard
Episodes